Edgar Fuller is an American mathematician. He is a distinguished professor in the department of mathematics and statistics at Florida International University.

References

Living people
Place of birth missing (living people)
Year of birth missing (living people)
American mathematicians
21st-century American mathematicians
Florida International University faculty